The Carbonell Awards recognize excellent theater in the South Florida region of the United States annually. The awards are named after the sculptor Manuel Carbonell, who designed the bronze and marble award that is given to the winners. Voting is conducted by three panels of ten members each. The program additionally awards college scholarships of $1,000 each to deserving high school students in South Florida.

Awards are given "to recognize and honor excellence in theater and the arts" in the following categories:

Best New Work (award to author)
Best Ensemble
Best Play Production (award to producing theater)
Best Play Director
Best Play Actor
Best Play Actress
Best Play Supporting Actor
Best Play Supporting Actress
Best Musical Production (award to producing theater)
Best Musical Director
Best Musical Actor
Best Musical Actress
Best Musical Supporting Actor
Best Musical Supporting Actress
Best Musical Direction
Best Musical Choreography
Best Scenic Design
Best Lighting
Best Costumes
Best Sound
Best Non-Resident Play Production (award to producing theater)
Best Non-Resident Play Director
Best Non-Resident Play Actor
Best Non-Resident Play Actress
Best Non-Resident Play Supporting Actor
Best Non-Resident Play Supporting Actress

References

External links
Carbonell Awards Website

American theater awards
Culture of Miami